The world record progression of the women's speed skating team pursuit over six laps as recognised by the International Skating Union:

References 

World Team Pursuit Women